Azaera is a genus of snout moths. It was described by William Schaus in 1913.

Species
Azaera lophophora (Dyar, 1914)
Azaera muciella (Schaus, 1913)
Azaera nodoses (Dyar, 1914)

References

Phycitinae
Moth genera